Silanus is a comune (municipality) in the Province of Nuoro in the Italian region Sardinia, located about  north of Cagliari and about  west of Nuoro.

Silanus borders the following municipalities: Bolotana, Bortigali, Dualchi, Lei, Noragugume.

Demographic evolution

References

Cities and towns in Sardinia